Eolais mac Biobhsach (alias '' "knowledge", anglicized "Wallis", "Olis" or "Olus" ) was a chieftain of 10th century Gaelic Ireland. He is noted as the first "full chieftain of the Conmaicne" of present-day south county Leitrim, and parts of west County Longford. His descendants are known as "the Muintir Eolais".

Biography
Eolais was born into a Túath of the Conmaicne settled in present-day south county Leitrim, in the second half of the 9th century. As an adult, he became chieftain of his sept. A charismatic leader, he became the first full chieftain of the "Conmaicne Réin"  AD 900.

He married, having at least three sons, named "Brocan", the ancestor of Shanley; "Anbeith", the ancestor of Mac Garry; and "Maolmuire", lord of Conmaicne Réin and ancestor of Mag Raghnaill (anglicised Mac Rannell, Reynolds). Ódhrán Ua hEolais, a famous scribe of Clonmacnoise, was probably his grandson.

Eolais's death is not recorded by the Irish Annals, but probably occurred between A.D. 920–960.

Legacy
Eolais Mac Biobhsach is the ancestor of the Muintir Eolais who were the most famous of the ancient Leitrim sub-septs of the Conmaicne territories of modern-day Leitrim (barony) and Mohill (barony). The primary sept of Eolais today are Reynolds, Mulvey, Shanley, and McGarry. Place names preserve his memory. The townland of Corryolus located in the town of Carrick on Shannon clearly retains his name. In the remote mountainous Cuilcagh-Anierin uplands, the oligotrophic lake named "Lough Munter Eolas" marks a borderline between west Cavan and south Leitrim.

Tributes
A well established Leitrim-Longford traditional fiddle group, trained by a Fr. Quinn since 1966, adopted the name "Ceolus" preserving his name, and they play music garnered from local manuscripts going back almost two hundred years.

Surname
O'Donovan claimed the family name ( "descendant of Eolais") is still found anglicised as "Olus" or "Olis".  two instances of the surname corrupted as "Oelase" and "Olase", are found in the Irish Fiants for Leinster. The surname must be very rare.

See also

 Muintir Eolais
 Ódhrán Ua hEolais
 Flannchad Ua hEolais

Notes and references

Notes

Citations

Primary sources

Secondary sources

Bibliography

External links

History of County Leitrim
People from County Leitrim
9th-century Irish people
10th-century Irish people
9th-century births
10th-century deaths
People of Conmaicne Maigh Nissi